Biscayne Park is a village in Miami-Dade County, Florida, United States. Biscayne Park was developed in the 1920s by Arthur Griffing and annexed into the city of Miami in 1925. With the arrival of the Great Depression, Miami gave up its jurisdiction, and Biscayne Park was incorporated as its own town in 1931. In 1933, the town decided to become a village, and changed its name to the Village of Biscayne Park. As of the 2020 census, the population was 3,117.

Geography
It is bordered to the north by the city of North Miami and to the south by the village of Miami Shores. The Biscayne Canal forms the southwest border of the village, and the Florida East Coast Railway forms the southeast border.

Surrounding areas
  North Miami
  North Miami    North Miami
 Unincorporated Miami-Dade County   Unincorporated Miami-Dade County
  Miami Shores    Miami Shores
  Miami Shores

Demographics

2020 census

As of the 2020 United States census, there were 3,117 people, 1,075 households, and 645 families residing in the village.

2010 census

As of 2010, there were 1,324 households, out of which 9.3% were vacant. In 2000, 31.3% had children under the age of 18 living with them, 44.9% were married couples living together, 14.8% had a female householder with no husband present, and 35.2% were non-families. 25.0% of all households were made up of individuals, and 7.2% had someone living alone who was 65 years of age or older.  The average household size was 2.55 and the average family size was 3.12. Estimated median household income in 2015: $82,888. Estimated per capita income in 2015: $32,505.

2000 census
In 2000, the village population was spread out, with 23.8% under the age of 18, 6.3% from 18 to 24, 34.1% from 25 to 44, 24.6% from 45 to 64, and 11.3% who were 65 years of age or older.  The median age was 37 years. For every 100 females, there were 93.5 males.  For every 100 women aged 18 and over, there were 89.8 men.

In 2000, the median income for a household in the village was $48,313, and the median income for a family was $53,409. Men had a median income of $39,964 versus $33,125 for women. The per capita income for the village was $22,923.   
In 2000, speakers of English as a first language was at 59.60%, with Spanish at 29.27%, French Creole at 9.40%, and French at 1.74% of the population.

Government
The village is governed by a mayor, vice mayor and three commissioners. It also has a village manager.

The village has a twelve-man police department.

References

External links
 

Villages in Miami-Dade County, Florida
Villages in Florida
1920s establishments in Florida
Populated places established in the 1920s